Lamadrid is a town in the northern Mexican state of Coahuila. It is the seat of the  municipality of Lamadrid. There were 1,780 inhabitants in 2000.

External links
Municipal information on Coahuila state website (in Spanish)

Populated places in Coahuila